Smart Uganda is a telecommunications network company in Uganda. It was established in March 2014 and still in existence to date. The company is owned and operated by Industrial Promotion Services, a subsidiary of the Aga Khan Fund for Development. The company first launched in Uganda and has made successful expansions in Burundi and Tanzania.

In August 2021, the company closed citing difficulties from the Covid-19 pandemic.

See also
List of mobile network operators in Uganda

References

External links

Telecommunications companies of Uganda
Telecommunications companies established in 2014
Mobile phone companies of Uganda
2014 establishments in Uganda